Siobhan Marshall is a New Zealand actress best known for her role as Pascalle West from the comedy/drama series Outrageous Fortune (2005–2010).

Career
Marshall attended Auckland's Unitec School of Performing Screen Arts and graduated in 2003.

In 2004, Marshall appeared on Shortland Street, playing a character coincidentally called Siobhan. She next appeared as "Dominique" in one episode of the kid's show Amazing Extraordinary Friends.

She is represented by Auckland Actors and Encompass Entertainment Group.

In 2015 she appeared on a sixth series of the New Zealand version of Dancing with the Stars with her professional dancing partner, Charlie Billington, where she was placed third in the competition.

Personal life
Marshall owned a home in Oratia, a suburb of Auckland, but lived with her mother in Auckland in 2013. She married actor Millen Baird in 2016. They have two children.

Filmography

Television

Film

References

External links

1983 births
Living people
New Zealand television actresses
Unitec Institute of Technology alumni
New Zealand soap opera actresses
21st-century New Zealand actresses